Red Springs may refer to:

Red Springs, North Carolina
Red Springs, Texas
Red Springs, Wisconsin

See also
Red Spring, West Virginia